Ismaila Jagne  (born 1 October 1984) is a Gambian international football midfielder.

Career
After playing in the youth teams of R.S.C. Anderlecht he started his senior career in Finland playing with Tervarit for 3 seasons. Afterwards, he signed with KF Trepça from Kosovo in 2006, before moving to Albania where he will play for KS Teuta Durrës, Skënderbeu Korçë, KS Turbina Cërrik and KF Naftëtari Kuçovë. In the season 2009-10 he played with Omayya Idlib in Syria. since 2017 Ismaila is acting as the president of Superstars Academy FC currently playing in the Gambian League.

References

External links
 Ismaila Jagne at Footballdatabase.eu

1984 births
Living people
Gambian footballers
The Gambia international footballers
Gambian expatriate footballers
Association football midfielders
KF Trepça players
Expatriate footballers in Kosovo
KF Teuta Durrës players
KF Skënderbeu Korçë players
KS Turbina Cërrik players
Expatriate footballers in Albania
Expatriate footballers in Finland
Expatriate footballers in Syria
Syrian Premier League players